Appleton is an Anglo-Saxon locational surname.

 Alistair Appleton, British television presenter
 Charles Appleton (academic) (1841–1879), Oxford don and scholarly entrepreneur
 Charles Appleton (cricketer) (1844–1925), English amateur cricketer
 Charles William Appleton (1874–1945), vice president of the General Electric Company, judge and Assistant District Attorney in New York City
 Colin Appleton, footballer
 Daniel Appleton, American publisher, 1800s founder of D. Appleton & Company
 Edward Victor Appleton, English physicist, known for his research on the ionosphere
 Edwin Nelson Appleton, American Medal of Honor recipient
 Francis R. Appleton (1854–1929), lawyer and member of the 400 during the Gilded Age
 Frederick Charles Appleton (1835–1914), Australian actor
 George Swett Appleton (1821–1878), American publisher
 Henry Appleton (captain) (fl. 1650–1654), English captain in the navy and commodore
 James Appleton (1786–1862), American abolitionist
 Jean Appleton (1911–2003), Australian painter, art teacher and printmaker
 John Appleton, American diplomat, politician, and newspaper editor
 John Appleton (academic), Master of University College, Oxford, England (–1408)
 John E. C. Appleton (1905–1990), Australian theatre and radio producer
 John F. Appleton (1838–1870), American Civil War general from Maine
 John Howard Appleton, American chemist
 John James Appleton (1789–1864), diplomat for the United States
 Jon Appleton, American composer, author and professor of music
 Larry Appleton, character from the TV series Perfect Strangers
 Michael Appleton, footballer
 Mike Appleton, British television producer
 Natalie Appleton, British/Canadian singer
 Nathan Appleton, American merchant and politician
 Nicole Appleton, British/Canadian singer
 Ray Appleton (1941–2015), American jazz drummer
 Ruel Ross Appleton (1853–1928), campaign manager for Mayor Gaynor of New York City
 Samuel Appleton (merchant) (1766–1853), American merchant and philanthropist
 Scott Appleton (1942–1992), American football player
 Stevie Appleton, British singer
 Thomas Gold Appleton (1812–1884), American author and artist
 Victor Appleton, house pseudonym, famous for the Tom Swift series
 William Appleton (politician) (1786–1862), congressman from Massachusetts
 Will Appleton (1889–1958), mayor of Wellington, New Zealand
 William Sumner Appleton (1874–1947), founder Society for the Preservation of New England Antiquities
 William M. Appleton (1920–2001), Pennsylvania politician
 William Henry Appleton (1814–1899), American publisher
 William Appleton (entrepreneur) (born 1961), American entrepreneur and technologist
 William H. Appleton (1843–1912), American soldier and Medal of Honor recipient
 William Thomas Appleton (1859–1930), Australian businessman, shipping agent and public servant

See also
 Appleton P. Clark Jr., American architect
 Appleton family, American political, religious and mercantile family

References

External links

English-language surnames
English toponymic surnames